Basheerinte Premalekhanam (Basheer's Love Letter) is a 2017 Indian Malayalam film directed by Aneesh Anwar. The film stars Farhaan Faasil and Sana Althaf in lead roles. It is a romantic comedy set in the 1980s. Cinematographer was Sanjay Harris.

Cast
 Farhaan Faasil
 Sheela
 Aju Varghese
 Indrans
 Madhu
 Manikandan R. Achari
 Sunil Sukhada
 Karthik Vishnu
 Sana Althaf
 Ponnamma Babu
 Ranjini Jose
 Sooraj Harris
 Naseer Sankranthi

Soundtrack

References 
 http://songs.so/basheerinte-premalekhanam-movie-songs-mp3-download/
 http://www.saavn.com/s/album/malayalam/Basheerinte-Premalekhanam-2017/hRIZGRPndDc_
 http://www.nowrunning.com/movie/19307/malayalam/basheerinte-premalekhanam/cast-and-crew/
 http://songspked.com/ 
 http://english.manoramaonline.com/entertainment/entertainment-news/farhaan-fazil-sana-firstlook-basheerinte-premalekhanam.html
 http://onlookersmedia.in/latestnews/farhan-fazil-is-back-with-basheerinte-premalekhanam/
 http://timesofindia.indiatimes.com/entertainment/malayalam/movies/news/Farhaan-Faasil-goes-retro-in-Basheerinte-Premalekhanam/articleshow/53239956.cms
 http://songspkfast.com/
 http://songspknet.com/
 http://www.filmymalayalam.com/news-basheerinte-premalekhanam-is-an-80s-love-story-354811.htm
 http://movielaza.com/lyrics/pranayamaanithu-song-lyrics-basheerinte-premalekhanam/
 http://www.malayalamlyricsonline.com/2017/01/penne-penne-kanmizhiyale-lyrics.html

External links
 

2010s Malayalam-language films
2017 films
Indian romantic comedy films